Shami Kermashani, also known as Shamurad Mushtaq  (1927–November 23, 1984), was a famous Kurdish poet from the city of Kermanshah, Iran, also known as Iranian Kurdistan. He has composed most of his poems in Southern Kurdish dialect. He became blind at the age of four because of smallpox.

References

 Kirmashan website: literature
 Kirmashan website: articles

1927 births
1984 deaths
20th-century Iranian poets
Kurdish poets
People from Kermanshah
Iranian blind people